Artemi Yurevich Kniazev (born 4 January 2001) is a Russian professional ice hockey defenseman currently playing for the San Jose Barracuda of the American Hockey League (AHL), as a prospect to the San Jose Sharks of the National Hockey League (NHL). He was selected by the Sharks in the 2019 NHL Entry Draft, and made his NHL debut in 2021. Internationally, Kniyazev played for the Russian national junior team at the 2021 World Junior Championships.

Playing career
Kniazev was drafted by the San Jose Sharks in the 2019 NHL Entry Draft. He was then signed to a three-year, entry-level contract with the Sharks on July 2, 2019 

In the 2021–22 season, Kniazev made his NHL debut with the San Jose Sharks on November 4, 2021, in a 3–5 loss to the St. Louis Blues.

Career statistics

Regular season and playoffs

International

References

External links

2001 births
Living people
Bars Kazan players
Chicoutimi Saguenéens (QMJHL) players
Expatriate ice hockey players in Canada
Expatriate ice hockey players in the United States
Russian expatriate ice hockey people
Russian ice hockey defencemen
San Jose Barracuda players
San Jose Sharks draft picks
San Jose Sharks players
Sportspeople from Kazan